Below are the squads for the 2015 EAFF Women's East Asian Cup tournament, held in China on August 1 to 8, 2015. There were 23 players in each squad, including 3 goalkeepers.

Head coach: Kim Kwang-Min

Head coach: Norio Sasaki

Head coach: Hao Wei

Head coach: Yoon Deok-yeo

References

EAFF E-1 Football Championship squads (women)